The 2011 Pan American Games were held in Guadalajara, Mexico and surrounding area. The Pan American Games ran from October 14 to October 30, 2011.

This is a list of competition venues that were used during the 2011 Pan American Games in Guadalajara, Mexico.

35 Venues were used, with a majority of them being built for the games.

Competition venues

See also
2011 Pan American Games

References

 
Venues of the Pan American Games